

396001–396100 

|-bgcolor=#f2f2f2
| colspan=4 align=center | 
|}

396101–396200 

|-bgcolor=#f2f2f2
| colspan=4 align=center | 
|}

396201–396300 

|-bgcolor=#f2f2f2
| colspan=4 align=center | 
|}

396301–396400 

|-bgcolor=#f2f2f2
| colspan=4 align=center | 
|}

396401–396500 

|-bgcolor=#f2f2f2
| colspan=4 align=center | 
|}

396501–396600 

|-bgcolor=#f2f2f2
| colspan=4 align=center | 
|}

396601–396700 

|-bgcolor=#f2f2f2
| colspan=4 align=center | 
|}

396701–396800 

|-bgcolor=#f2f2f2
| colspan=4 align=center | 
|}

396801–396900 

|-bgcolor=#f2f2f2
| colspan=4 align=center | 
|}

396901–397000 

|-id=931
| 396931 Nerliluca ||  || Luca Nerli (born 1954) is an amateur astronomer and active member of the Gruppo Astrofili Montagna Pistoiese. He is experienced in science communication, and deep sky and planetary imaging. He contributed to the discovery of the rings of the dwarf planet Haumea. || 
|}

References 

396001-397000